Trial of the Sixteen may refer to:
Trial of the Sixteen (1880), a trial of sixteen members of the Narodnaya volya in the Russian Empire 
Trial of the Sixteen, a staged trial of 16 leaders of the Polish Secret State held by the Soviet Union in Moscow in 1945
 Trial of the Sixteen, the first of the Moscow Trials during the Great Purge in the USSR
 Trial of the Sixteen (2011–2015), a trial of sixteen Jehovah's Witnesses in the Russian Federation